Anastasia Love Sagorsky, also known as Staci Keanan, is an American deputy district attorney, law professor, and former actress. Keanan is best known for portraying the role of Nicole Bradford on the NBC sitcom My Two Dads, from 1987 to 1990, and as Dana Foster on the ABC/CBS sitcom Step by Step, from 1991 to 1998.

Early life
Keanan was born in Devon, Pennsylvania, the daughter of Jacqueline (née Love) and Irv Sagorsky, a car salesman. She has a sister, Pilar.

In 2002, Keanan graduated cum laude with a Bachelor of Arts degree in Art History and a minor in French from UCLA. Her academic honors include membership in the Golden Key International Honour Society and Phi Beta Kappa honor societies.

Acting career
At age five, she began modeling and appeared in print, radio, and television advertisements, including television commercials for My Little Pony, Burger King and Hershey's Kisses. As a youth, Keanan moved with her mother and sister to New York City, where she changed her name to "Staci Love" and began appearing in summer stock. She made her credited television debut in the 1987 miniseries [[I'll Take Manhattan (miniseries)|I'll Take Manhattan]].

At the age of 12, shortly after she moved with her family to Los Angeles, she was cast as Nicole Bradford in the TV series My Two Dads. The series ran from 1987 to 1990. During the 1990-91 season, she co-starred in the short-lived series Going Places with Alan Ruck, Heather Locklear, and Hallie Todd. The following year, Keanan was cast as Dana Foster in the TV series Step by Step which aired from 1991 to 1998. By 1997 Keanan had changed her name from Staci to Stacy.Keanan had roles in the short Stolen Poem (2004) and the films Hidden Secrets (2006), and Death and Cremation (2010) with Brad Dourif, Jeremy Sumpter, and Daniel Baldwin. In 2009 Keanan appeared in Holyman Undercover, and in 2010 she appeared in a cameo in You Again with Step by Step castmates Christine Lakin and Patrick Duffy. She also co-starred in the 2009 film Sarah's Choice.

Law career and teaching
Keanan attended Southwestern Law School and was admitted to the State Bar of California in 2013. She currently practices law under her given birth name, Anastasia Sagorsky, in the Los Angeles area. In 2014, Keanan worked as a Deputy District Attorney in the Riverside County District Attorney's Office prosecuting felony cases involving violent crime or death. Keanan joined the Los Angeles County District Attorney's office as a Deputy District Attorney in 2016 where she currently serves. In January 2021, she became an adjunct associate professor of law at Southwestern Law School. In 2022, she taught a course on how to properly prosecute/defend driving under the influence (DUI) cases in court.

Personal life
On February 11, 2017, Keanan married actor and producer Guy Birtwhistle.

Filmography

Stage
Musical theatreMiss Lulu Bett, Berkshire Theater Festival, Stockbridge, MassachusettsAnnie, Theatre at Stagedoor Manor, Loch Sheldrake, New YorkGeorgia Avenue, Goodspeed Opera House, East Haddam, ConnecticutThe King and I, Norma Terris Theatre, Chester, ConnecticutGypsy, Norma Terris Theatre, Chester, Connecticut

PlaysOld Glories, two one-act plays by Elliot Shoenman, directed by Mark L. Taylor, Zephyr Theatre, Hollywood, CaliforniaAbove the Fold (Diane), Zephyr Theatre, Hollywood, CaliforniaRed Flags (Janet), Zephyr Theatre, Hollywood, CaliforniaMoment in the Sun (Diane Bellini), by Elliot Shoenman, Matrix Theatre, Hollywood, CaliforniaLast Call at Moby Dick's (Caroline), by Ed Marill, directed by Mark L. Taylor, McCadden Place Theatre, Hollywood, CaliforniaSunset Park'' (Young Evelyn) second run, by Marley Sims and Elliot Shoenman, directed by Mark L. Taylor, Zephyr Theatre, Hollywood, California

Awards

References

External links

20th-century American actresses
21st-century American actresses
21st-century American lawyers
Actresses from Pennsylvania
American child actresses
American child models
American film actresses
American musical theatre actresses
American stage actresses
American television actresses
California lawyers
Female models from Pennsylvania
Living people
People from Chester County, Pennsylvania
Southwestern Law School alumni
University of California, Los Angeles alumni
21st-century American women lawyers
1975 births